Goussainville is a commune in the department of Val-d'Oise, northern France. Goussainville is part of the urban unit (agglomeration) of Paris.

Goussainville was the site of the crash of the supersonic Tupolev Tu-144 during the 1973 Paris Air Show which led to the deaths of all six people on board and eight more on the ground and is less than 6 km from Gonesse, the site of the crash of the supersonic Concorde operating as Air France Flight 4590 on 25 July 2000.

In 1974, a year after the deadly Tupolev Tu-144 crash, Charles de Gaulle Airport opened—putting the small commune directly in the flight path of the busy airport. The constant noise was a major disturbance and acted as a "constant reminder of the deadly crash."

Population

Transport
Goussainville is served by two stations on Paris RER line D: Goussainville and Les Noues.

Education
, there are 1,718 pupils in 13 public pre-schools and 2,782 elementary school pupils in 13 public primary schools. There are a total of 19 campuses with a total of about 4,500 students.

Junior high schools:
Collège Georges Charpak
Collège Montaigne

Senior high schools:
 Lycée Romain Rolland

See also
Communes of the Val-d'Oise department

References

External links
Official website 

Land use (IAURIF) 
Association of Mayors of the Val d'Oise 

Communes of Val-d'Oise